Henry Somerset may refer to:
 Henry Somerset, 2nd Earl of Worcester (c. 1496–1549), English nobleman
 Henry Somerset, 1st Marquess of Worcester (bef. 1590–1646), English peer, son of Edward Somerset, 4th Earl of Worcester
 Henry Somerset, 1st Duke of Beaufort (1629–1699/1700), 3rd Marquess of Worcester, English peer
 Henry Somerset, 2nd Duke of Beaufort (1684–1714), only son of Charles Somerset, Marquess of Worcester
 Henry Somerset, 3rd Duke of Beaufort (1707–1745), also known as Henry Scudamore, the elder son of the 2nd Duke of Beaufort
 Henry Somerset, 5th Duke of Beaufort (1744–1803), son of the 4th Duke of Beaufort
 Henry Somerset, 6th Duke of Beaufort (1766–1835), British peer and son of the 5th Duke of Beaufort
 Henry Somerset, 7th Duke of Beaufort (1792–1853), British peer, soldier and son of the 6th Duke of Beaufort
 Henry Somerset (British Army officer) (1794–1862)
 Henry Somerset, 8th Duke of Beaufort (1824–1899), British peer, soldier and politician, son of the 7th Duke of Beaufort
 Henry Somerset, 9th Duke of Beaufort (1847–1924), British peer and son of the 8th Duke of Beaufort
 Lord Henry Somerset (1849–1932), British politician and third son of the 8th Duke of Beaufort
 Lady Henry Somerset (1851–1921), British philanthropist, temperance leader and campaigner for women's rights
 Henry Somerset, 10th Duke of Beaufort (1900–1984), British peer, son of the 9th Duke of Beaufort
 Henry Somerset, 12th Duke of Beaufort (born 1952), British peer, son of the 11th Duke of Beaufort
 Henry Plantagenet Somerset (1852–1936), pioneer pastoralist and politician in Queensland, Australia
 Henry de Somerset, Dean of Exeter between 1302 and 1307